The Reni Seaport is a port located on the left bank of the Danube. It is an important transport hub of Ukraine, where the work of river, sea, road, and rail transport is closely intertwined. Navigation takes place throughout the year. The maximum depth near the berths is 3.5–12 m (average 7.5 m), which allows you to handle any type of cargo. According to the Law of Ukraine "On Seaports of Ukraine," the functions of the seaport administration are performed by the Rhine branch of the state enterprise of the Ukrainian Sea Ports Authority.

Gallery

See also

List of ports in Ukraine
Transport in Ukraine

References

Transport in Izmail Raion
Buildings and structures in Odesa Oblast
Ports of Odesa Oblast
Danube
1816 establishments in Ukraine
Reni, Ukraine
Ukrainian Sea Ports Authority